"What a Woman Wants to Hear" is a song recorded by Canadian country music artist Jamie Warren. It was released in 1999 as the fourth single from his second studio album, Just Not the Same. It peaked at number 10 on the RPM Country Tracks chart in October 1999.

Chart performance

Year-end charts

References

1998 songs
1999 singles
Jamie Warren songs